Knut "Knutte" Kroon (19 June 1906 – 27 February 1975) was a Swedish footballer who played as a striker.

Career
Kroon was born in Hälsingborg, and began his career with Stattena IF. In 1925, he moved to the nearby club Helsingborgs IF where he made 516 appearances and scored 318 goals. Kroon won Allsvenskan five times with the club, and retired from his career in 1942.

He made 35 appearances in the national team (1925–1934) and was a member of the team in 1934 FIFA World Cup. He scored the winning goal (3-2) in the first round against Argentina. Some sources consider him as the first goalscorer in the history of World Cup preliminary competition, when Sweden scored against Estonia 7 minutes into the game on 11 June 1933, in Stockholm. Some other sources consider this goal was scored by Estonian goalkeeper Evald Tipner, thus being an own goal.

He was also part of Sweden's squad at the 1936 Summer Olympics, but he did not play in any matches.

References

1906 births
1975 deaths
Swedish footballers
Sweden international footballers
1934 FIFA World Cup players
Helsingborgs IF players
Allsvenskan players
Association football forwards
Sportspeople from Helsingborg